Great polemonium is a common name for several plants and may refer to:

Polemonium carneum
Polemonium occidentale